James Parker Slater (born December 9, 1982) is an American former professional ice hockey forward. He spent the entirety of his National Hockey League (NHL) career with the Atlanta Thrashers/Winnipeg Jets organization.

Playing career

As a youth, Slater played in the 1996 Quebec International Pee-Wee Hockey Tournament with the Detroit Little Caesars minor ice hockey team.

Slater was drafted in the first round, 30th overall, by the Atlanta Thrashers in the 2002 NHL Entry Draft. He played for the Michigan State Spartans for four years. He joined the Thrashers for their 2005–06 season opener before being demoted to their AHL affiliate, the Chicago Wolves, for four games. After he scored two points in those four games, he was called up and stayed with the Thrashers for the rest of the season. Slater joined the Winnipeg Jets in 2011 upon the Atlanta Thrashers' relocation there. On June 13, 2012, Slater renewed his contract with the Jets, signing a 3-year, $4.8 million contract. Slater was the longest tenured player with the Jets/Thrashers organization, having played with them since the 2005-06 season up to and including the 2014-15 season.

On September 29, 2015, he signed with Genève-Servette of the National League A (NLA). His NLA debut was delayed due to a work permit issue. Slater eventually made his debut for Geneva on October 9, 2015 in Kloten and scored his first goal that same day. On January 9, 2016, Slater was severely hit to the head by teammate Matt D'Agostini and suffered a concussion and a severe cervical spine injury. He eventually returned to game action a few weeks later. Slater was suspended one game for checking HC Lugano's Julien Vauclair to the head in Game 2 of the NLA semi-finals. On May 27, 2016, Slater was signed to a one-year contract extension by Geneva. Slater underwent foot surgery in the off-season and missed most of training camp.

On September 1, 2016, Slater was named captain of Genève-Servette. Slater missed the end of the 2016–17 regular season as a healthy scratch, after displaying poor performances and a lack of energy. Daniel Vukovic took over the captaincy before Slater was inserted back in the lineup for the start of the 2017 playoffs. Slater played his last game for Geneva on March 7, 2017 in game 2 of the 1/4 finals, before being taken out of the lineup as a healthy scratch. Cody Almond assumed the captaincy as Vukovic was suspended.

On July 21, 2017, as a free agent, Slater agreed to a one-year contract with HC Fribourg-Gottéron of the National League (NL). He spent two seasons with the club, skating in 93 games.

On September 3, 2018, Slater was named to Michigan State's staff as a volunteer assistant coach, effectively ending his professional hockey career.

On September 20, 2019, he joined the Washington Capitals' Player Development Department.

Personal life
His father, Bill Slater, was a defensive lineman in the National Football League (NFL) for the Minnesota Vikings and the New England Patriots.

Career statistics

Regular season and playoffs

International

Awards and honors

References

External links
 

1982 births
Living people
American men's ice hockey centers
Atlanta Thrashers draft picks
Atlanta Thrashers players
Chicago Wolves players
HC Fribourg-Gottéron players
Genève-Servette HC players
Ice hockey players from Michigan
Michigan State Spartans men's ice hockey players
National Hockey League first-round draft picks
Ice hockey players at the 2018 Winter Olympics
Olympic ice hockey players of the United States
People from Lapeer, Michigan
Sportspeople from Metro Detroit
Winnipeg Jets players
AHCA Division I men's ice hockey All-Americans